Aaron Lashane Thomas (born October 31, 1992), known professionally as Teezo Touchdown, is an American rapper, singer, songwriter, and record producer.

Early life
Thomas was born on October 31, 1992 in Beaumont, Texas to a father who works as a DJ. He was surrounded by music from multiple genres as a child due to his father's career. As a result, he grew up listening to a wide range of artists such as Judas Priest, Prince, Kraftwerk, and Marvin Gaye. Throughout his youth, he learned to DJ and produce music through using his father's equipment.

Career

2010–2019: Career beginnings
While attending high school in Beaumont, Thomas began uploading music to YouTube under the names AyeTee and later Teezo Suave. He filmed early music videos in his high school, which received little attention, and produced songs for rappers in his city.

In 2016, he changed his stage name to Teezo Touchdown. Around this time, he began collaborating with musical collective CVKE Supply, who uploaded the music videos for his songs "Professional" and "It Depends" to YouTube in 2017. In 2018, he released two mixtapes on SoundCloud, titled "The Example" and "Cover Boy".

In February 2019, he released the song "100 Drums" with producer Coop, which was described by NME as, "[a rap song] about the gun violence in his hometown over Panic! At The Disco’s breakout emo-pop anthem ‘I Write Sins, Not Tragedies’". Pitchfork opined on the song, stating "when will rappers understand that liking one of the most popular songs of the 2000s is not as different as they think?" The video garnered attention on social media and led to co-signs by Chance The Rapper and Trippie Redd. In November 2019, he collaborated with Coop again on the song "Slice".

2020–present: Viral success, Call Me If You Get Lost Tour, fashion
In July 2020, Thomas released three singles, being "Strong Friend", "Careful", and "Sucka" featuring Fred Flippstone. About "Sucka", Pitchfork stated the song lacked "the ear for production, nimble flow switch-ups, or, well, talent." Each song was released with a music video directed by Thomas. In October 2020, he released the singles "Rooting For You" and "Bad Enough" featuring Thomas Lopez with accompanying music videos. In November 2020, he released the single "Social Cues" with an accompanying music video.

In February 2021, he released the single "Technically" with an accompanying music video and made a guest appearance in the music video for Fousheé's song "Single AF". In June 2021, he featured on the song "RunItUp" with Tyler, the Creator, which Pitchfork called "unmemorable". In the same month, he released a series of song covers in a video titled "Coverboy2". The video acted as a sequel to his 2018 mixtape "Cover Boy" and included an interview with Replica Man Magazine. He was styled in Balenciaga for the magazine's cover shoot.

In July 2021, he made an appearance on Kenny Beats' YouTube series "The Cave" and freestyled over an instrumental that the two created together. He also released his single "Mid" and began his "Rid The Mid" campaign on social media in promotion for the single. The campaign consisted of a series of Instagram skits in which he ran for mayor in the fictional city of "Midville" and detailed what he would do if elected. Some of his policies included making it illegal to steal someone else's lighter and making it illegal for one's barber to push back their hairline.

In September 2021, he modeled for Marc Jacobs's Heaven collection and performed his song "I'm Just A Fan" for Moncler and Alyx's Mondo Genius event. In October 2021, he appeared in a commercial for Telfar's "Bag Security Program III".

On February 10, 2022, he began touring in the United States with fellow American rappers Tyler, the Creator and Vince Staples and Colombian-American singer Kali Uchis on the Call Me If You Get Lost Tour, to support the release of Tyler, the Creator's album Call Me If You Get Lost, and also appearing on the song from the album "RunItUp". He also released the single "Handyman" with producer Kenny Beats. On March 6, 2021, his web series Watch Your Step premiered on Telfar TV, an online streaming platform created by American fashion label Telfar. The series is composed of sketch comedy shorts that promote Telfar products.

Artistry

Influences
Thomas is influenced by '80s icons Rick James and Prince; as he told Pigeon and Planes, “What those artists are to me is a point of reference.”

Musical style
Thomas' music pulls influences from a variety of genres. Dazed has described Thomas as, "...a delightfully weird, genre-defying enigma who, without breaking a sweat, combines hip-hop, autotune, radio pop, country music, trap beats, emo-punk, acoustic arpeggios and whatever else is in his brain into infectious, digestible three-minute earworms."

About his musical style, Thomas said, “I’m never chasing a sound because that would just be satire. Rather than trying to copy a sound, I look at what all this music represents: Why is rock tearing through these stadiums; how is rap tearing up the club; how is pop tearing up the charts? I’m still figuring all that out, but the energy of rock is always going to be in my music; it might not be guitar-led, but the intensity and urgency of rock will be there.”

Visual style
Thomas directs all of his own videos, which are usually accompanied by promotional comedy skits and expansive promo campaigns, such as "Rid The Mid". He films most of his music videos and skits in front of a graffiti-covered garage in his home of Beaumont, Texas. The garage is continuously transformed based on the theming of the video; as Complex wrote, "In 'Rooting For You,' it’s the backdrop for a boyband of sports mascots. Meanwhile in 'Bad Enough', the garage is transformed into a football field complete with astroturf, bleachers, and a cheer squad." Pitchfork wrote, "Teezo has stirred more social media chatter for the six inch nails stuck in his hair, or the black mesh tops and leather pants that make him look like he’s in a parody of an ’80s hair metal video, than he has for any song."

Fashion style
Our Generation Music wrote that Thomas' image consists of, "nails in his hair, chain-linked necklaces, and eye-black fit for the football field". His managerial alter-ego, named Eugenius Hanes, wears a ginger wig and a cowboy hat. He is involved in high fashion, having previously modeled for Marc Jacobs, Balenciaga, Alyx, Moncler, and Telfar.

Discography

Mixtapes

Singles

As lead artist

Concert tours
Supporting
 Tyler, the Creator - Call Me If You Get Lost (2022)

References

External links 
 Teezo Touchdown Interviewed in Replica Man magazine 

American pop musicians
Rappers from Texas
Rap rock musicians
1992 births
Living people